Rato Machindranath Jatra (Buṅga Dyaḥ Jātrā) is a chariot procession honouring the Vajrayani Buddhism deity of compassion Avalokiteśvara and as an incarnation of shiva for hindu people which is held in Lalitpur, Nepal. It is one of the greatest religious events in the city and the longest chariot festival celebrated in the country. 

Buṅga Dyaḥ is also known as Raktalokitesvara Karunamaya and Rāto Machhindranāth and is revered as the giver of rain. The name Rato Machhendranath means Red Machhendranath in a reference to the color of the deity's image. The chariot festival is held according to the lunar calendar, so the date is changeable. It begins on the 4th day of the bright fortnight of Bachhalā, the seventh month in the lunar Nepal Sambat calendar.

Chariot procession
The chariot procession was instituted to celebrate the arrival of Bunga Dyah in Nepal and the end of a devastating drought. It was started when Narendra Deva was the king (640-683 AD). 

Preparations for the festival begin with the construction of a 60-foot tall chariot at Pulchok at the western end of Lalitpur. When the chariot is complete, the image of Bunga Dyah from his temple is installed in it. Revellers then drag the chariot through the streets of Lalitpur on a tour that lasts a month. The chariot of Bunga Dyah is accompanied on the journey by a similar but smaller chariot of Chākuwā Dyah (चाकुवा द्यः).

The route of the chariot procession starts at Pulchok and passes through Gabahal, Mangal Bazar, Hakha, Sundhara, Chakrabahil, Lagankhel and ends at Jawalakhel. As per time-honored tradition, the chariot is pulled exclusively by women on the stretch between the localities of Iti and Thati. This part of the chariot procession is known as Yākah Misāyā Bhujyā (याकः मिसाया भुज्या).

The parade finishes at the open ground of Jawalakhel which is situated at the western side of Lalitpur. There, the festivities conclude with the ceremony of Bhoto Jatra, the display of the bhoto, a traditional Nepalese vest.

During the "Barha Barsa Jatra", that happens once in every 12 years, the chariot of the Machhindranath is constructed at Bungamati. The chariot is pulled all the way from Bungamati through Bhaisepati, Nakkhu, Bhanimandal, Jhamsikhel and to Pulchowk. The chariot is pulled from Jhamsikhel (near Ideal Model School) to Pulchowk at night. Then the chariot is pulled through the town at its normal route. After the Bhoto Jatra ceremony at Jawalakhel, the idol of Rato Machhindranath is taken back to Bungamati, where it spends the 6 months of the year.

Bhoto Jatra 

Bhoto Jatra, which literally means "vest festival", is the climax of the chariot procession of Bunga Dyah Jatra.
As per Nepal Bhasa the Jatra should be considered as Pwaklo Jatra because Pwaklo refers to Vest while Bhoto has sleeves. 

After the two chariots arrive in Jawalakhel, astrologers choose an auspicious date to hold the Bhoto Jatra festival. On the appointed day in the presence of the head of state, a government official climbs on to the chariot and holds up a jewel-studded black vest from the four sides of the chariot so that all the people gathered around can have a look at it. 

The display is a re-enactment of an event that happened eons ago. 
According to legend, a Jyapu (Newar farmer) lost the vest which he had received as a gift from the serpent god Karkotaka Naga for doing him a favour. There are two legends of the favor one of them being the Jyapu providing him some ayurvedic herbs by examining the ill wife of Karkotaka Naga which healed her. Another legend says that the Jayapu was frightened when Karkotaka Naga asked for some herbs to cure his ill wife so the Jyapu who didn't have any idea regarding herbs gave him his own 'khiti'(dirts from his sweaty body) that healed her.
 
One day, the farmer had come to Jawalakhel to watch the chariot pulling festival where he saw someone wearing his missing garment. 
A quarrel developed over the vest, and since neither party could prove ownership, it was agreed that the undershirt would be kept with Bunga Dyah until the rightful owner comes to claim it with adequate proof. Since then, the vest has been shown to the public annually as a call to potential claimants to step forward. 

The living goddess Kumari of Patan also arrives in Jawalakhel to observe Bhoto Jatra. She watches the ceremony from a special rest house. The auspicious day when the Bhoto Jatra is held is determined by astrologers, so the date is changeable. In 2014, the vest showing will be held on 22 June.

After the festival, the chariot is dismantled and the parts are stored until it is time for the procession the next year. Rato Machhendranath is taken to a temple in the nearby village of Bungamati, also known as the second home of the rain god. The deity spends the next six months in that temple.

Gallery

References

Parades in Nepal
Buddhist festivals in Nepal